Analia Bortz (born 1967) is a medical doctor with postdoctoral studies in bioethics. She became the first female Latin American rabbi when she was ordained in Jerusalem at the  Seminario Rabinico Latinoamericano in 1994. She is a Senior Rabbinic Fellow of the Shalom Hartman Institute. Bortz was chosen as 1 of 100 international most influential women by the BBC. Rabbi Dr. Bortz is listed  among Tablet Magazine's "15 American Rabbis You Haven't Heard Of, But Should". Rabbi Dr. Bortz was selected as the AJWS Global Justice Fellow cohort 2019–2020. Listed as Forward 50 2019, The Makers and the Shakers of America's Most Influential Leaders.

She and her husband Rabbi Mario Karpuj founded Congregation Or Hadash in Sandy Springs, Georgia.

Career
Rabbi Dr. Bortz is the Founding Rabbi Emeritus of Congregation Or Hadash in Atlanta, Ga. Bortz wrote for "The Women's Torah Commentary" and The Women's Haftarah Commentary: New Insights from Women Rabbis on the 54 Weekly Haftarah Portions, the 5 Megillot & Special Shabbatot (2008), edited by Elyse Goldstein.
She is the author of  The Voice of Silence: A Rabbi's Journey into a Trappist Monastery and Other Contemplation (2017), which is about her silent retreat at the Christian monastery called Monastery of the Holy Spirit. She went there after having vocal cord strain and polyps and being advised to stop speaking for a long time.

Bortz received a medical degree from the Universidad Buenos Aires in 1990. Bortz is a Senior Rabbinic Fellow at the Shalom Hartman Institute in Jerusalem, graduated in 2007. Bortz is a 2017 graduate and facilitator of the Center for Compassionate Integrity and Secular Ethics at Life University. In 2018, she was selected as one of the BBC 100 Women, a list of inspiring and influential women from around the world.

Listed as Forward 50 2019, The Makers and the Shakers of America's Most Influential Leaders https://forward.com/culture/436476/analia-bortz-scholar-of-the-human/

As a vocal activist against anti-Semitism, Bortz has spoken twice at the UN (2015 and 2016).

Bortz helped create the Bioethics Committees in Chile and Children's Healthcare of Atlanta. Bortz founded "Hope for Seeds" for couples struggling with infertility and sterility.

She is an active member of JScreen advocating for research and prophylaxis of genetic disorders with greater incidence in the Ashkenazi Jewish population. Bortz serves as a board counseling member of the Atlanta Jewish Fertility Foundation. She is the co-founder of "BaKeN (in the Nest): "בריאות-קהילה-נפש", an initiative to create positive and loving enforcement for those with mental health illness and for caregivers who support them, combating the societal stigmatization of mental illness.

Positions and honors
Judge for the National Council of Jewish Books (Annual Awards of Jewish Book in the History & Zionism category).
Rabbinic Advisory Board member of the Shalom Hartman Institute in Jerusalem and North America.
Former Board member of FIDF Southeast Region
Board member of JNF Southeast Region.
Alumna of African American-Jewish Coalition.
Delegate of BEINGS (BIOTECH and Ethical Imagination) 2015, Emory University.
Faculty member of the Florence Melton Adult School, a project of The Hebrew University of Jerusalem.
Board member of the Interfaith Children's Movement and the National Council Board at AIPAC.
Recipient of a YWCA Women of Achievement award in 2011 for her work on infertility.
Nominated as Jewish Hero of the year 2011–5772
Listed among Tablet Magazine "15 American Rabbis You Haven't Heard Of, But Should".
Listed as Forward 50 2019, The Makers and the Shakers of America's Most Influential Leaders https://forward.com/culture/436476/analia-bortz-scholar-of-the-human/
 American Jewish World Services (AJWS) Global Justice Fellow 2019-2020 https://ajws.org/wp-content/uploads/2019/08/GJF-Fellows-2019-20.pdf
Jewish Theological Seminary (JTS) Rabbinic Cabinet
Honorary Doctor of Divinity Degree, Jewish Theological Seminary, June 2021

Publications 

 "Theologia: Jutzpa?"
 "En la búsqueda Permanente de la Respuesta Divina" "Permanent seekers of God's Answers: Struggles with Bioethical quests", Majshavot 2013
 Text Messages Parashat Nitzavim. Jewish Lights 2012
 "The Voice of Silence, A Rabbi's Journey into a Trappist Monastery and Other Contemplations" Westbow-Nelson Publishing 2017.
 Beware of the Tent Peg: Jael and the HErmeneutics of Subversion (Academia.edu)
 Levinas, Beyond Binary Categorization (Academia.edu)
 Deborah and Jael in Judges 4 & 5: And the Women Prevail (Academia.edu)
 Contextualizing the Book of Judges: History and Historiography through Male and Female lenses (Academia.edu)

References

10. https://forward.com/opinion/437008/forward-50-2019-meet-the-machers-and-shakers-who-moved-inspired-and-awed/

1967 births
20th-century American rabbis
21st-century American rabbis
Argentine Conservative rabbis
Living people
Conservative women rabbis
BBC 100 Women